Skua Glacier is a small southern tributary of Astro Glacier in the Miller Range. Mapped by the northern party of the New Zealand Geological Survey Antarctic Expedition (NZGSAE) (1961–62) and so named because of the skuas seen at its lower part in December 1961.

Glaciers of Oates Land